Corruption Watch may refer to the following:
Corruption Watch (South Africa), South African non-governmental organization
Indonesia Corruption Watch, Indonesian non-governmental organization